Staškov (until 1899 ) is a village and municipality in Čadca District in the Žilina Region of northern Slovakia.

History 
In historical records the village was first mentioned in 1640.

Geography 
The municipality lies at an altitude of 451 metres and covers an area of 21.874 km². It has a population of about 2,746 people.

Famous people 
Jozef Kroner, Slovak actor

References

External links 
http://www.staskov.sk

Villages and municipalities in Čadca District